Davidson is an electoral district of the Legislative Assembly in the Australian state of New South Wales. It is represented by Jonathan O'Dea of the Liberal Party.

Covering parts of Sydney's Northern Beaches North Shore regions, it spills across portions of the Northern Beaches Council and Ku-ring-gai Council LGAs. It includes all of the namesake suburb of Davidson, as well as Belrose, St Ives, St Ives Chase, Lindfield, Roseville and Castle Cove. It also includes parts of Oxford Falls, Frenchs Forest, Forestville, Killara and Gordon.

Davidson includes portions of two of the most Liberal-supporting areas of Sydney, and has been in the hands of the Liberal Party for its entire existence. While  frequently runs dead in northern Sydney, Davidson is especially hostile territory for Labor. The only times that Labor has even remotely threatened the Liberals' hold on the seat came during the two "Wranslides" in 1978 and 1981, which were the only times that the Liberals have failed to win at least 60 percent of the two-party-preferred vote. However, even on those occasions, the Liberals won enough primary votes to retain the seat outright. Since the 1990s, Labor has been lucky to get 30 percent of the two-party-preferred vote, and has even been pushed into third place on some occasions.

Members for Davidson

Election results

References

External links

Davidson
1971 establishments in Australia
Constituencies established in 1971
Northern Beaches